is a private university in Kurume, Fukuoka, Japan, established in 2006. It is a member of Japan Association of Catholic Universities.

References

External links
 Official website 

Educational institutions established in 2006
Private universities and colleges in Japan
Universities and colleges in Fukuoka Prefecture
2006 establishments in Japan
Catholic universities and colleges in Japan